Rick Aviles (October 14, 1952 – March 17, 1995) was an American stand-up comedian and actor of Puerto Rican descent, best remembered for portraying the villainous Willie Lopez in the film Ghost.

Career
Born in Manhattan, Aviles worked as a street performer and stand-up comedian on the Greenwich Village night-club circuit in New York in the 1970s and 1980s. In 1978, a Variety reviewer called him "a comic with a future". He was frequently seen in the NYC subways, doing his act for the riders. In 1981, he landed the role of Mad Dog in the film The Cannonball Run. He went on to act in fourteen more film productions. In 1987, Aviles landed a small part as the maintenance man in the film The Secret of My Success, starring Michael J. Fox. That same year he became the host of It's Showtime at the Apollo, and continued as host until 1991.

A Variety review of his stand-up act in 1990 noted, "Utilizing masterful ethnic impersonations and a remarkably rubbery face, Puerto Rican comic Rick Aviles comes off as one of the brightest and most consistently clever stand-ups working the circuit today".

In 1990, Aviles landed his most memorable role: Willie Lopez in the film Ghost, a smash hit at the box office that received multiple Oscar nominations.  He also appeared in Jim Jarmusch's Mystery Train (film) (1989) as Will Robinson; Francis Ford Coppola's The Godfather Part III (1990) as Mask #1; Brian De Palma's Carlito's Way (1993) as Quisqueya; in Waterworld (1995) as the Gatesman, and in Joe's Apartment (1996) as the voice of a cockroach.

Among the television series in which he appeared are Mr. & Mrs. Dracula (1980), The Day Women Got Even (1980), The Carol Burnett Show (1991) and Stephen King's The Stand (1994).

Death
On April 17, 1995, Variety reported that Aviles had died of heart failure on March 17. Eleven years later, a 2006 article in Entertainment Weekly listed him as among the celebrities who had contracted HIV and died from complications of AIDS.

Filmography

See also
 List of Puerto Ricans
 List of Puerto Ricans of African descent
 African immigration to Puerto Rico

References

External links
 

1952 births
1995 deaths
American male film actors
American male television actors
American male voice actors
Male actors from New York City
AIDS-related deaths in California
People from Manhattan
American people of Puerto Rican descent
20th-century American male actors